Adrenocortical adenoma is commonly described as a benign neoplasm emerging from the cells that comprise the adrenal cortex. Like most adenomas, the adrenocortical adenoma is considered a benign tumor since the majority of them are non-functioning and asymptomatic. Adrenocortical adenomas are classified as ACTH-independent disorders, and are commonly associated with conditions linked to hyperadrenalism such as Cushing's syndrome (hypercortisolism) or Conn's syndrome (hyperaldosteronism), which is also known as primary aldosteronism. In addition, recent case reports further support the affiliation of adrenocortical adenomas with hyperandrogenism or florid hyperandrogenism which can cause hyperandrogenic hirsutism in females. "Cushing's syndrome" differs from the "Cushing's disease" even though both conditions are induced by hypercortisolism. The term "Cushing's disease" refers specifically to "secondary hypercortisolism" classified as "ACTH-dependent Cushing's syndrome" caused by pituitary adenomas. In contrast, "Cushing's syndrome" refers specifically to "primary hypercortisolism" classified as "ACTH-independent Cushing's syndrome" caused by adrenal adenomas.

Presentation

Adrenal adenomas are often categorized as endocrine-inactive tumors considering that majority of them are non-functioning and asymptomatic. Functional adrenocortical adenomas demonstrate symptoms consistent with mixed endocrine syndromes. In most reported cases of adrenocortical adenoma, patients have presented with one or multiple endocrine syndromes such as hyperaldosteronism/Conn's Syndrome, hypercortisolism/Cushing's syndrome, hyperandrogenism/feminization, virilization, or hirsutism. Some of the common symptoms associated with adrenocortical adenomas include:

Musculoskeletal
 Osteopenia
 Muscle weakness/muscle atrophy

Cardiovascular
 Hypertension

Endocrine and Metabolic
 Obesity

→More prevalent in males
 virilization

→More prevalent in females
 Hyperandrogenism
 Irregular menstrual cycles

Neuropsychological
 Sleep disorders
 Depression

Skin
 Easy bruising
 Stretch marks
 Hirsutism
 Acne

Cause

Study of the reported cases indicate that most adrenocortical adenomas occur due to neoplastic proliferation of adrenal cortical cells within the three distinct layers of adrenal cortex. In humans, the adrenal cortex comprises three concentric zones including the zona glomerulosa, zona fasciculata, and zona reticularis that under normal conditions respond to body's physiological demands for steroid hormones. The adrenal cortex is considered a dynamic organ in which senescent cells are replaced by newly differentiated cells. This constant renewal facilitates organ remodeling which contributes to dynamic characteristics of the adrenal cortex.
 correspondingly, the developmental physiology of the adrenal cortex is believed to play a pivotal role in formation of the adrenocortical tumors. Hence, the molecular mechanisms involved in normal development of the adrenal glands are like double edged swords that can lead to the formation of tumors within the adrenal cortex. Moreover, recent studies suggest that mutations affecting the molecular pathways of the adrenocortical region can stimulate abnormal proliferation and tumor formation. Through these studies, the cyclic AMP-dependent protein kinase A signaling has been identified as a key mediator of cortisol secretion, and the mutations associated with the dysregulation of cyclic AMP - protein kinase A pathways have been implicated in the adrenocortical pathophysiology.

Pathophysiology
If functional, adrenocortical adenomas can affect the normal activities of the adrenal cortex. Located within the adrenal glands are the three zones that are responsible for secretion of the three major classes of adrenal steroids. Hence, functional adrenocortical adenomas can induce over-secretion of adrenal steroids associated with pure or mixed endocrine syndromes, a condition commonly known as hyperadrenalism.

Diagnosis
Due to their asymptomatic nature, most reported cases of adrenal adenomas have been discerned fortuitously through autopsy, or during medical imaging, particularly CT scan (computed tomography) and magnetic resonance imaging. Hence, they have earned the title incidentaloma referring to small adenoma discovered incidentally. Though adrenocortical adenomas are considered challenging to differentiate from the normal adrenal cortex, they appear as well-circumscribed lesions once isolated. 

Imaging Diagnostics
 Computed Tomography (CT scan)
 Magnetic Resonance Imaging (MRI)

Laboratory Tests
 CRH Stimulation Test
 High-dose-dexamethasone suppression test

Gross Description
 Well-circumscribed lesion
 Size ≤ 5 cm
 Weight ≤ 50 grams
 often appear as golden-yellow color mass
(may have focal dark regions corresponding to hemorrhage, lipid-depletion, and increased lipofuscin)

Histopathology

The microscopic histopathology analysis of the tissue samples obtained from the adrenal cortex of individuals presenting with adenoma-associated symptoms such as primary aldestronism (PA) indicates that adenoma cells are relatively larger with different cytoplasm, and increased variation in nuclear size. This indication is based on comparison between the healthy (normal) and affected (adenoma-associated) adrenal cortex tissue samples. 

Adrenocortical adenomas are most commonly distinguished from adrenocortical carcinomas (their malignant counterparts) by the Weiss system, as follows:

Total score indicates:
 0-2: Adrenocortical adenoma
 3: Undetermined
 4-9: Adrenocortical carcinoma

Treatment
 Non-functioning cases of adrenocortical adenoma can be managed through long-term followups and monitoring.
 The treatment approach for the functioning cases of adrenocortical adenoma depends on the type of disorders they induce and their advancement. Surgical excision may be required if its presence is resulting in atrophy of the adrenal glands and the surrounding tissues.

In order to acquire better treatment strategies, it is important to further examine, study and discern the distinct molecular mechanisms involved in the formation of endogenous Adrenal Adenomas, hyperplasias, and ACTH-independent Cushing's Syndrome to improve the available diagnostic and prognostic markers that can assist clinicians in the management and advance-treatment of such conditions.

Prognosis
 The long-term outlook for individuals diagnosed with non-functional adrenocortical adenoma is usually excellent.
 The long-term outlook for individuals diagnosed with functional adrenocortical adenoma is good with early diagnosis and treatment.

Epidemiology

 Prevalence: Female > Male
 More common in adults
 Relatively earlier onset in females (ages ≤ 20) than males (ages ≤ 30)
 Most common cause of ACTH-independent Cushing's syndrome

See also
 Hyperplasia
 Adrenal tumor
 Cushing's syndrome
 Conn's syndrome
 Hypercortisolism
 Hyperaldosteronism
 Hyperandrogenism
 Adrenal gland
 Adrenal paraganglioma
 Adrenal Pheochromocytoma
 Adrenal ganglioneuroma

References

External links 

Endocrine neoplasia
Adrenal gland disorders